The 1910 Alabama Crimson Tide football team (variously "Alabama", "UA" or "Bama") represented the University of Alabama in the 1910 college football season. It was the Crimson Tide's 18th overall and 15th season as a member of the Southern Intercollegiate Athletic Association (SIAA). The team was led by head coach Guy Lowman, in his first year, and played their home games at the University of Alabama Quad in Tuscaloosa and the Birmingham Fairgrounds in Birmingham, Alabama. They finished the season with a record of four wins and four losses (4–4 overall, 0–4 in the SIAA).

After Alabama opened the season with shutouts over both Birmingham College and the Marion Military Institute, the Crimsons lost four consecutive games to SIAA opponents by a margin of 104–0. The squad rebounded with a 5–3 victory over Tulane at New Orleans and a 9–0 victory over Washington and Lee to finish the season with an overall record of 4–4.

Before the season
In March 1910, J. W. H. Pollard announced his resignation as head football coach and athletic director, and took the same positions at Washington and Lee University. After several months of searching for a replacement, in August the University's Committee on Athletics hired Guy Lowman from the University of Missouri to serve as both head football coach and athletic director. With his hiring, many expected him to successfully guide the football team through what was viewed as its toughest schedule in school history.

The team reported for its first practice on September 10, and at that time six players returned with at least one season of experience with he Crimson and White. At the start of practice, coach Lowman identified as the teams weakest positions being the linemen and backs.

Schedule

Game summaries

Birmingham College

Alabama opened the season with this 25–0 victory over Birmingham College (now Birmingham–Southern College) at Tuscaloosa. After a scoreless first quarter where Birmingham unsuccessfully tries several trick plays, Alabama scored 22 second quarter points. After a safety, the Crimsons scored their first touchdown of the season on an Adrian Van de Graaff run to take a 7–0 lead. After a Lambert touchdown run, Van de Graaff scored his second touchdown of the game, and after a 20-yard Farley Moody field goal Alabama led 22–0 at halftime. A second half Moody field goal made the final score 25–0. The victory brought Alabama's all-time record against Birmingham College to 1–0.

Marion Military Institute

After a victory over Birmingham College to open the season, Alabama won its second game 26–0 against the Marion Military Institute at Tuscaloosa. In the game, Robert Bumgardner scored three touchdowns with Adrian Van de Graaff scoring the fourth on a 70-yard run in the victory. The victory brought Alabama's all-time record against the Marion Military Institute to 2–0.

Georgia

Against the Georgia Bulldogs, Alabama lost its first game of the season 22–0 before 12,000 fans at Birmingham. After a scoreless first quarter, Georgia scored second-quarter touchdowns on runs by W. F. McClelland and Robert MacWhorter to take an 11–0 halftime lead. In the third quarter, the Bulldogs scored on a 25-yard MacWhorter run and in the fourth on a 75-yard J. F. Slater fumble returned for a touchdown to make the final score 22–0. The loss brought Alabama's all-time record against Georgia to 3–3–3.

Georgia Tech

Against the Georgia Tech Yellow Jackets, Alabama lost its second game of the season 36–0 at Tuscaloosa. The loss brought Alabama's all-time record against Georgia Tech to 1–3.

Ole Miss

Against the Ole Miss Rebels, Alabama suffered its third loss of the season 16–0 at Greenville. Fran Shields scored the only points of the first half on his touchdown run in the first quarter. In the second half, Alonzo Lee scored on an 11-yard run and Steve Mitchell scored on a 10-yard run in the fourth to give the Rebels the 16–0 victory. The loss brought Alabama's all-time record against Ole Miss to 4–2–1.

Sewanee

Against the Sewanee Tigers, Alabama lost its fourth consecutive game 30–0 at Birmingham. The loss brought Alabama's all-time record against Sewanee to 1–6.

Tulane

Against the Tulane Green Wave, Alabama ended their four-game losing streak after they defeated the Greenies 5–3 at New Orleans. Alabama led 2–0 at halftime with their only points coming on a first quarter safety, which occurred after a Tulane player tried to return a missed Alabama field goal. After Tulane took a 3–2 lead in the third, Farley Moody kicked a 20-yard, game-winning field goal for Alabama. The victory brought Alabama's all-time record against Tulane to 3–2–1.

Washington and Lee

Against the Washington and Lee Generals, Alabama closed their season with a 9–0 victory at Birmingham. After a scoreless first half, Alabama took a 9–0 lead in the second half after three successful Farley Moody field goals. The victory also marked the return of former Alabama head coach J. W. H. Pollard, who resigned his position with the Crimsons to take the head coaching position with the Generals in the spring of 1910. The victory is Alabama's only all-time matchup against Washington and Lee.

Personnel

Varsity letter winners

Coaching staff

Notes

References
General

 

Specific

Alabama
Alabama Crimson Tide football seasons
Alabama Crimson White football